Layne Flack (May 18, 1969 – July 19, 2021) was an American professional poker player from Rapid City, South Dakota, residing in Montana and Nevada.

Poker career
Flack started playing cards with his grandparents, but became engrossed in the game while working at a casino. He would regularly go to another casino after work to play poker. Despite becoming the Night Manager in his job, he quit as he was spending too much time on poker to continue working full-time as well.

He met up with Johnny Chan who helped him improve his game and, following a big loss, encouraged Flack to ensure he had a lot of rest before a tournament. Ted Forrest then took him under his wing, eventually playing in the biggest games in the world.

Flack had lifetime live tournament play winnings of over $5,000,000. His 43 cashes at the WSOP accounted for $2,740,892 of his live tournament winnings.

World Series of Poker

Flack won six bracelets at the WSOP. He got the nickname "Back to Back Flack" after winning two consecutive Legends of Poker events in August 1999. He would accomplish the same feat three years later at the 2002 and the 2003 WSOP series.

World Series of Poker Bracelets

World Poker Tour

Flack made numerous appearances on the World Poker Tour and captured one WPT title.

 2002 World Poker Finals - 2nd place ($186,900)
 WPT Invitational Tournament - Winner ($125,000)
 2004 UltimateBet.Com Poker Classic - 2nd place ($500,000)
 2008 Legends of Poker - 8th place ($105,620)

Death
It was announced on July 19, 2021, that Flack was found dead. According to Clark County coroner Melanie Rouse, the cause of death was listed as fentanyl, cocaine and methamphetamine intoxication. He was 52.

References 

Poker Pro Layne Flack Died of Drug Overdose

External links
World Poker Tour Profile
CardPlayer article
Hendon Mob tournament results

1969 births
2021 deaths
American poker players
People from Rapid City, South Dakota
World Poker Tour winners
World Series of Poker bracelet winners